François Georges Mareschal Bièvre Marquis, known as Georges de Bièvre (16 November 1747 – 24 October 1789), was a French writer and playwright.

Works 
 Variations comiques sur l’abbé Quille
 Le Séducteur (1783)
 Les Réputations (1787)
 Les Amours de l’ange Lure, 1772 (on ligne).
 Lettre écrite à Madame la comtesse Tation,1770 (on line.
 Vercingentorixe, tragedy in one act and in verses, 1770 (on line).
 Kalembour [sic], Supplément à l'Encyclopédie, 1777 (on line).

Références
 Antoine de Baecque (éd.), Calembours et autres jeux sur les mots d’esprit, Paris, Payot, 2000. Recueil de textes du marquis.
 A. D., Biévriana ou Jeux des mots de M. de Bievre, Paris, Maradan, 8 (i. e. 1800), 1814 (3e éd.).
 Gabriel de Mareschal de Bièvre, Le Marquis de Bièvre, sa vie, ses calembours, ses comédies, 1747-1789, Paris, Plon-Nourrit, 1910
 Melançon, Benoît, « Oralité, brièveté, spontanéité et marginalité : le cas du marquis de Bièvre », in les Marges des Lumières françaises (1750-1789). Actes du colloque organisé par le groupe de recherches Histoire des représentations (EA 2115). 6–7 December 2001 (Université de Tours), sous la direction de Didier Masseau, Genève, Droz, coll. «Bibliothèque des Lumières», LXIV, 2004, (p. 215-224).

References

18th-century French writers
18th-century French male writers
18th-century French dramatists and playwrights
Writers from Paris
1747 births
1789 deaths